The SS Statendam was a Dutch passenger ship built by Harland and Wolff for the Holland America Line as a replacement for the second Statendam which was sunk after being torpedoed six times on 19–20 July 1918. The ship was laid down in 1921. but due to the changes in American emigration laws and shortages of steel in England, construction of the ship was slow and the ship would not be completed until 1929. During World War 2 the ship was still in service until she was called back to the Netherlands. On 11 May 1940 during the German invasion of the Netherlands the ship caught fire and was declared a total loss.

History

Construction

After the second Statendam was sunk during World War 1, the new replacement was ordered as an award for Holland America Line in 1919, and her keel was immediately laid down in 1921. However, the construction of the ship took longer than intended and became more expensive due to changes in American emigration laws and shortages of steel in England. because of this after her launch in September 1924, work on the ship soon stopped for three years until in 1927 the Dutch government allowed the hull of the unfinished Statendam to be towed to Schiedam for completion by Wilton Fijenoord shipyard.

Career

After 8 years of her construction, the Statendam was finally delivered to the Holland America Line in 1929. Around 300 guests were on the ship during her sea trials before she departed on her maiden voyage on the Rotterdam to New York service route. In winter she would service cruising from New York to the Caribbean. In 1933, she was Refitted and modernized which decrease her tonnage to 28,291 gross register tons. Then in the same year, she made her first cruise to the Mediterranean and in 1935 to the Scandinavian countries. In December 1937 while departing New York she collided with the American ship Gold and cloud. But both ships suffer minimal damage.

Second World War
In 1939, with the outbreak of the Second World War, she left Rotterdam on her final North Atlantic crossing on 24 November 1939, and when she returned back to the Netherlands, she was laid up there due to the war. On 11 May 1940 with German invasion of the Netherlands the Statendam caught fire and was a total loss. There are many theories about why the ship caught fire. According to some sources she was set in ablaze by the Dutch to prevent the Germans from capturing her. Others say she was hit by German bombs. Whatever the event, she was a total loss and was sold for scrap in August 1940.

Gallery

References

External links

Ships of the Holland America Line
Steamships
Ships built in Belfast
Maritime incidents in May 1940
Ships built by Harland and Wolff
1924 ships